The first USS Saipan (CVL-48/AVT-6/CC-3) was a light aircraft carrier of the United States Navy, the lead ship of her class of carrier. She was later selected for conversion into a command ship in 1963–1964, but instead of becoming a command ship she was converted to the Major Communications Relay Ship Arlington (AGMR-2) in 1965.

Saipan was laid down on 10 July 1944 by the New York Shipbuilding Corporation, Camden, New Jersey, launched on 8 July 1945, sponsored by Mrs. John W. McCormack, and commissioned on 14 July 1946, Capt. John G. Crommelin in command.

Service history
Commissioned
Commissioned 11 months after the close of World War II, Saipan trained student pilots out of Pensacola, Florida, from September 1946 to April 1947 when, reassigned to Norfolk, Virginia, as homeport, she departed the Gulf of Mexico; participated in exercises in the Caribbean; then proceeded to Philadelphia for overhaul. In November, she returned to Pensacola; but, in late December, after training midshipmen, steamed back to the east coast to serve with the Operational Development Force.

In February 1948, however, her work in jet operational techniques, carrier support tactics, and electronic instrument evaluation was interrupted briefly. From the 7th to the 24th, she was engaged in transporting the United States delegation to the Venezuelan Presidential inauguration and back. On her return, she conducted local operations off the Virginia Capes, and in April, after a visit to Portsmouth, New Hampshire, she resumed work for the Operational Development Force. On 18 April, she also relieved  as flagship of Carrier Division 17 (CarDiv 17).

Fighter Squadron 17A
On 19 April, she departed Norfolk for Quonset Point, Rhode Island, where, on 3 May, she embarked Fighter Squadron 17A. Three days later, all squadron pilots had qualified in FH-1 Phantom jets. The squadron had become the first carrier-based jet squadron.
Back at Norfolk by the end of the month, Saipan was relieved of flagship duties. In June, she returned to New England waters; and, in July, she commenced overhaul at Norfolk. In December, she resumed local operations. On 24 December, she was ordered to embark two of the Navy's latest type helicopter, the XHJS-1, and three Marine Corps HRP-1 helicopters and proceeded north to Greenland to assist in the rescue of eleven airmen downed on the ice cap. Departing Norfolk on Christmas Day, she arrived off Cape Farewell on 28 December and prepared to launch the helicopters as soon as weather allowed. On 29 December however, a C-47, equipped with jet assist takeoff and skis, landed on the ice, took on the marooned airmen and made it out again.

1949-1954
Saipan then returned to Norfolk, arrived on 31 December, and sailed again on 28 January 1949. Steaming south, she conducted exercises out of Guantanamo Bay into March and returned to Hampton Roads on 10 March. From 11 to 19 March, she conducted operations for the development force; then made a reserve training cruise to Canada. At the end of May, she again commenced work for the Operational Development Force. Three months later, she conducted her second reservist cruise of the year, then qualified Royal Canadian Navy pilots in carrier landings.

From November 1949 – March 1951, Saipan remained on the east coast, operating from the Virginia Capes south. On 6 March 1951, she got underway as flagship, CarDiv 14, and sailed for duty with the Sixth Fleet. Deployed for three months, she plied the waters of the western Mediterranean until the end of May, then headed for home. On 8 June, she was back at Norfolk, whence she resumed operations in the western Atlantic from Greenland to the Caribbean.

For over two years, Saipan continued Second Fleet operations, interrupting them for midshipman cruises during the summers of 1952 and 1953 and for an overhaul. In October 1953, she departed the east coast and steamed for the Panama Canal and the Pacific. On 30 October, she arrived at San Diego, whence she continued on to Pearl Harbor, Yokosuka, and duty off the coast of Korea in support of the uneasy truce agreement.

Assigned to TF 95, Saipan was primarily engaged in surveillance and reconnaissance missions along the coast and in inspection patrols of the islands just south of the 38th parallel. In January 1954, she interrupted her patrols to provide air support for Japanese manned LSTs ferrying former Chinese POWs from Inchon to new homes on Taiwan. In early February, she participated in amphibious exercises in the Ryukyus, then returned to Inchon to stand by in the event she was needed for an evacuation of Indian troops from Panmunjom. In March, amphibious exercises took her to the Bonins. She then returned to Japan, but instead of resuming truce patrols, she took on 25 AU-variant Corsairs and five H-19A helicopters at Yokosuka and steamed south. On 18 April, VMA-324 pilots flew the AUs off her flight deck and landed them at Tourane (now Danang) Air Base, to support the French Aéronavale fighting at the battle of Dien Bien Phu in the latest days of the First Indochina War. There the aircraft were turned over to French forces. Later in the day, Saipan entered the harbor, offloaded spare parts and maintenance personnel, and departed for Manila.

On 20 April, she delivered the helicopters to Air Force personnel in the Philippines; and, at the end of the month, she resumed operations off the coast of Korea. On 8 May, Saipan put into Sasebo, and, through the 24th, remained in Japanese waters. On the 25th, she got underway to return to Norfolk via the Suez Canal. On 20 July, she completed her round the world cruise.

Hurricane Hazel
In October, Saipan again sailed south to the Caribbean. Arriving as Hurricane Hazel hit the Greater Antilles, razing areas of Hispaniola, the carrier was immediately assigned to relief work. From 13 to 20 October 1954, she delivered food and medical supplies and personnel to isolated areas of Haiti; then, after being honored by the Haitian government, she returned to Norfolk. On 1 November, she entered the shipyard there for overhaul, and, in April, resumed operations with a cruise to the Caribbean. In June, she was again attached to the aviation training center at Pensacola; and, through the summer, conducted qualification exercises. At the end of September, she was ordered to Mexico to again assist in hurricane relief work. From 1–9 October, her helicopters evacuated survivors, flew in rescue personnel, and distributed food, water and medical supplies, primarily in the flooded Tampico area. On 12 October, she returned to Pensacola, where she remained until April 1957. On the first of that month, she sailed for Bayonne, New Jersey, where she began inactivation and was decommissioned on 3 October 1957.

Conversion
Reclassified AVT-6 on 15 May 1959, Saipan remained in the Atlantic Reserve Fleet until March 1963. She then entered the Alabama Drydock and Shipbuilding Company yard at Mobile, Alabama, to begin conversion to a command ship. Very briefly designated CC-3, she was instead reclassified as Major Communications Relay Ship AGMR-2 on 1 September 1964 while still undergoing conversion. On 8 April 1965, she was renamed Arlington, in honor of Arlington County, Virginia, the site of one of the Navy's first radio stations; and, on 12 August 1966, she completed her conversion. As Arlington (AGMR-2), she sailed for Norfolk where she was recommissioned on 27 August 1966.

Fitting out occupied the remainder of the year. In January 1967, she conducted shakedown exercises in the Caribbean, and, in February, she sailed for the Bay of Biscay and exercises off northern Europe. At the end of March, she returned to Norfolk, whence in April, she again steamed to the Caribbean. On her return to the Hampton Roads area, she prepared for deployment to the western Pacific.

Vietnam
During her first patrol in the Tonkin Gulf from 21 August to 18 September 1967, she provided reliable message handling facilities for ships of the 7th Fleet in support of combat operations; and, in addition, assisted ships in repairing and better utilizing their electronic equipment. On returning to the Philippines after her first patrol, Arlington received a new satellite communications terminal; and, on 2 October, she departed Subic for Taiwan.

There for only three days, she continued on to Tonkin Gulf, where she resumed her communications relay duties. At the end of the month, she shifted south to provide communications support to ships in the "Market Time" area off South Vietnam. After 34 days on station, she spent five days in Hong Kong, then returned to Subic Bay, whence she steamed to Tonkin Gulf in early December 1967 for her third "Yankee Station" communications patrol. On 27 December, she departed the area and headed north. On 4 January 1968, she arrived at Yokosuka, and, on 19 January, she got underway to return to Vietnam.

Arriving back on "Yankee Station" on 24 January 1968, she departed again on 26 January, participated in exercises in the Sea of Japan; then returned to "Yankee Station."

On station from 13 February to 10 March, she returned to Yokosuka on 14 March, remained until 3 April, and resumed operations in Tonkin Gulf on 10 April. A visit to Sydney followed completion of her April patrol; but, by mid-June 1968, she was back on station. From 20 to 22 July, she again visited Hong Kong, then sailed for Yokosuka.

Manned Spacecraft Recovery Force
Between the end of August and mid-November 1968, she completed two more tours on "Yankee Station", and in early December, she got underway for Pearl Harbor. There at mid-month, she conducted communications tests; and, on 18 December, she departed Hawaii in TF 130, the Manned Spacecraft Recovery Force, Pacific. Acting as primary landing area communications relay ship, she participated in the recovery of Apollo 8 and returned to Pearl Harbor on 29 December 1968. Two days later, she sailed for the Philippines, and, on 17 January 1969, she resumed direct communications support for naval units in Tonkin Gulf. On 6 February, she departed "Yankee Station," and, after upkeep at Yokosuka, conducted operations off southern Japan and in the Ryukyus. Toward the end of March, she sailed for Hong Kong, whence she returned to Vietnam.

Remaining on station from 6 to 14 April 1969, she tested her Apollo communications equipment, and, on the 15th, headed back to Pearl Harbor. On 2 May, she arrived in Hawaii and once again joined TF 130. Again assigned as primary landing area communications relay ship, she departed Pearl Harbor on 11 May and steamed for the Apollo 10 recovery area, some 2,400 miles south of Hawaii. On 26 May, the capsule was recovered and the assigned ships returned to Hawaii. From there, Arlington proceeded to Midway Atoll where she provided communications support for the Nixon-Thieu conference on 8 June 1969, and, the next day, she sailed west.

On 27 June 1969, the communications ship returned to the Vietnamese coast. On 7 July, however, she was ordered east for her third Apollo recovery mission. Arriving in the recovery area on 21 July, she tested her equipment; and, on the following day, moved to Johnston Island. On 23 July, she embarked President Richard Nixon for an overnight visit; and, on 24 July, supported the recovery of Apollo 11. Crew and capsule successfully recovered, Arlington headed for Hawaii, whence she steamed to the west coast.

Deactivation and decommissioning
On 21 August 1969, she arrived, for the first time, at her homeport, Long Beach, and four days later shifted to San Diego to begin inactivation. She was decommissioned on 14 January 1970 and berthed with the Inactive Fleet at San Diego. The ship was stricken from the Navy List on 15 August 1975, and was sold by the Defense Reutilization and Marketing Service (DRMS) for scrapping on 1 June 1976.

Awards

USS Saipan (CVL-48) 
World War II Victory Medal
Navy Occupation Service Medal with "Europe" clasp
National Defense Service Medal 
Korean War Service Medal 
United Nations Korea Medal
Republic of Korea War Service Medal (retroactive)

USS Arlington (AGMR-2) 

 Meritorious Unit Commendation with star (2 awards)
 National Defence Service Medal with star (2 awards)
 Armed Forces Expeditionary Medal
 Vietnam Service Medal with 7 campaign stars
 Republic of Vietnam Meritorious Unit Citation (Gallantry Cross Medal with Palm)
 Republic of Vietnam Campaign Medal

Gallery

See also
List of aircraft carriers
List of aircraft carriers of the United States Navy

References

External links

USS Saipan CVL48 Association homepage
Navy photos of Saipan
USS Arlington Association homepage

Saipan-class aircraft carriers
Ships built by New York Shipbuilding Corporation
1945 ships
World War II aircraft carriers of the United States
Cold War aircraft carriers of the United States
Cold War auxiliary ships of the United States